"I'll Be True" is a 1953 song written by Bill McLemore and performed by Faye Adams.  The song was Faye Adams' second US Billboard R&B chart entry and her second number one on that chart. "I'll Be True" stayed at number one for one week and Adams was backed by the Joe Morris Orchestra.

Covers
Later in 1953, Bill Haley & His Comets recorded the song.

References
 

1954 singles
Faye Adams songs